Anne Basset (1520 – before 1558) was an English lady-in-waiting of the Tudor period, reputed to have been the mistress of King Henry VIII.

Biography
Anne was born in 1520, the fourth child of Sir John Basset and Honor Grenville (daughter of Sir Thomas Grenville of Stowe in Kilkhampton, Cornwall and his wife Isabella). As her father died when she was young, Anne was brought up by her mother and stepfather, Arthur Plantagenet, Lord Lisle, in the English enclave of Calais. Lord Lisle was the illegitimate son of Edward IV of England, and thus Henry VIII's uncle.

Court career
Anne's mother, had attempted to secure a place for her two daughters (Anne and her sister Katharine Basset) in the service of Queen Anne Boleyn several times, but to no avail. She persisted in her efforts to secure them positions and eventually, after sending a large consignment of quails to Anne's successor, Queen Jane Seymour, the latter relented. 

She allowed Lady Lisle to send her daughters but warned her that only one position could be found. Anne was the sister accepted and was sworn into service the day after the pregnant queen took to her chamber for her lying-in.

Anne is rumoured to have attracted Henry VIII in 1538 and 1539, and is rumoured to have been the king's mistress. The ambassadors thought that she might become his fourth wife in 1540, and again in 1542, just after Queen Catherine Howard was sentenced to death.

In August 1540 Anne Bassett and others ladies of the court visited Portsmouth to see a newly built ship. They sent Henry VIII a joint letter which was signed by Mabel, Lady Southampton, Margaret Tallebois, Margaret Howard, Alice Browne, Anne Knyvett (daughter of Thomas Knyvett), Jane Denny, Jane Meutas, Anne Bassett, Elizabeth Tyrwhitt, and Elizabeth Harvey.

She was in an unspecified position in the household of Catherine Parr, sixth and last wife of King Henry VIII.

Anne was maid of honour to Queen Mary I. On 11 June 1554, Robert Swyfte reported her marriage to Sir Walter Hungerford in a letter to Francis Talbot, 5th Earl of Shrewsbury, as having taken place "on Thursday last...at which day the Queen shewed herself very pleasant, commanding all mirth and pastime". There were two children of the marriage, who both died without issue.

Anne died before 1558, when Sir Walter — with the permission of Mary — married Anne Dormer.

References in popular culture
Anne Bassett is the basis of the character Nan Bassett in Kate Emerson's novel, "Secrets of the Tudor Court: Between Two Queens"., as well as E. Knight's "My Lady Viper".

Notes

References

1521 births
Year of death missing
Mistresses of Henry VIII
Anne
English ladies-in-waiting
Household of Jane Seymour
Household of Anne of Cleves
Household of Catherine Howard
Court of Mary I of England
Wives of knights